The Eritrean National Olympic Committee (IOC code: ERI) is the National Olympic Committee representing Eritrea. It was created in 1996 and recognised by the IOC in 1999.

Eritrea made its debut at the 2000 Summer Olympics in Sydney where it sent three athletes to compete in track and field events. In the 2018 Winter Games, athlete Shannon-Ogbani Abeda represented the country in skiing.

See also
 Eritrea at the Olympics

References

Eritrea
 
Sports governing bodies in Eritrea
Sports organizations established in 1996